USS Aurore II (SP-460) was a United States Navy patrol vessel in commission from 1917 to 1919.

Aurore II was built as a private steam yacht or motorboat of the same name in 1916 by the Luders Marine Construction Company at Stamford, Connecticut. On 10 August 1917, the U.S. Navy purchased Aurore II from Stuart Wyeth of Philadelphia, Pennsylvania, for use as a section patrol vessel during World War I. She was commissioned at the Philadelphia Navy Yard as USS Aurore II (SP-460) on 1 October 1917.

Assigned to the 4th Naval District, Aurore II—renamed USS SP-460 in April 1918—operated in the Delaware River estuary and in coastal waters in the Delaware Capes area for the remainder of World War I and into 1919.  She carried out patrol duties, served as a dispatch boat, and transported passengers.  SP-460 was decommissioned on 12 August 1919 and sold on 24 September 1919 to Mr. J. A. Branden of New York City.

Notes

References

Department of the Navy Naval History and Heritage Command Online Library of Selected Images: U.S. Navy Ships: USS Aurore II (SP-460), 1917-1919. Renamed SP-460 in 1918. Formerly the civilian motor boat Aurore II (1916)
NavSource Online: Section Patrol Craft Photo Archive: SP-460 ex-Aurore II (SP 460)

Patrol vessels of the United States Navy
World War I patrol vessels of the United States
Ships built in Stamford, Connecticut
1916 ships
Individual yachts